Decus is a Latin word meaning "ornament".  It may refer to

 Decus et tutamen, "an ornament and a safeguard", motto on the one-pound sterling coin
 DECUS, the Digital Equipment Computer Users' Society

See also
Decussation
Decs (disambiguation)